Arturo Penney (1884-1946) was an Argentine amateur footballer, who played as forward in Boca Juniors.

Penney was born in Buenos Aires, the brother of Alberto Penney. In 1908 he made his debut in the Club Boca Juniors against Belgrano Athletic, with a result 3–1 in favor of Boca. Penney played for the Boca team until 1910. 

Arturo Penney finished his playing career in the Club Atlético Atlanta.

References

External links

www.historiadeboca.com.ar

Argentine footballers
Footballers from Buenos Aires
Boca Juniors footballers
1880s births
Year of death missing
British Argentine
Association football forwards
Río de la Plata